Manila's 5th congressional district is one of the six congressional districts of the Philippines in the city of Manila. It has been represented in the House of Representatives of the Philippines since 1987. The district consists of barangays 649 to 828 in the south Manila districts of Ermita, Intramuros, Malate, Port Area, San Andres and south Paco. It is currently represented in the 19th Congress by William Irwin C. Tieng of Asenso Manileño and Lakas–CMD.

This District also includes the Manila City Hall within its borders.

Representation history

Election results

2022

2019

2016

2013

2010

See also
Legislative districts of Manila

References

Congressional districts of the Philippines
Politics of Manila
1987 establishments in the Philippines
Congressional districts of Metro Manila
Constituencies established in 1987